The 2007 Netball Superleague Grand Final featured Team Bath and Galleria Mavericks. Team Bath would eventually retain the title but in the grand final it was Mavericks who started the stronger and were leading 10–12 after the first quarter and 21–22 at half time. Both Rachel Dunn and Pamela Cookey initially underperformed for Team Bath. However in the third quarter, Cookey scored 7/8 while  Player of the Match, Geva Mentor, made a number of key turnovers to deny Mavericks shooting opportunities. Their combined efforts saw Team Bath take the lead for the first time. However a return of 9/9 from Mavericks' Louisa Brownfield saw Team Bath lead by just 36–35 after three quarters. With just four minutes remaining the score was still 45–45. However after an injury time out, Team Bath returned the stronger with both Dunn and Cookey converting the goals that eventually saw them finish as winners by 53–45.

Route to the Final

Match summary

Teams

References

2006–07 Netball Superleague season
2006-07
Team Bath (netball) matches
Mavericks Netball matches
Netball Superleague